Moydow is a barony in County Longford, Republic of Ireland.

Etymology
Moydow barony takes its name from the village of Moydow (from Irish Maigh Dumha, "plain of the mound").

Location

Moydow barony is located in central County Longford, stretching from the River Shannon to Richmount Hill.

History
Anciently Moydow barony was part of a territory known as Tethbae. The barony was formed from the territories of Clanawlye (Ardagh & Moydow), and parts of the territories of Moybrawne (Taghshinny parish), Clanconnor (part Kilcommock, part Cashel parishes) and Muintergalgan.

List of settlements

Below is a list of settlements in Moydow barony:
Keenagh (northern part)
Killashee
Moydow

References

Baronies of County Longford